HMS Captain was a 70-gun third-rate ship of the line of the Royal Navy, built according to the 1733 proposals of the 1719 Establishment at Woolwich Dockyard, and launched on 14 April 1743.

Francis Light, founder of Penang, served for a few months as an apprentice on Captain around 1759.

In 1760, the Captain was reduced to a 64-gun ship.

On August 12, 1771 the Captain entered Boston Harbor with John Montagu, Rear-Admiral of the Blue Squadron and newly appointed Commander-in-Chief of the North American Station. She served as Montagu's flagship while he oversaw the Royal Navy's support of customs enforcement under the Townshend Acts.

The Captain was present in Boston Harbor—along with the Active and Kingfisher—on December 16, 1773 when the Boston Tea Party took place. The ships were readied for action, and "it was expected that the men of war would have interfered" to prevent the destruction of the tea, but according to Admiral Montagu the civil leadership never called for his assistance. He claimed that if they had, he could have easily prevented the tea's destruction, "but must have endangered the Lives of many innocent people by firing upon the town", presumably with the guns of the Captain.

In 1777 the Captain was converted to serve as a storeship and renamed Buffalo.

In 1781, with 60 guns back on board, although she only had 18-pounders on the lower deck, she participated in the Fourth Anglo-Dutch War at the Battle of Dogger Bank.

Buffalo returned to the role of storeship until she was broken up in 1783.

Notes

References

Lavery, Brian (2003) The Ship of the Line – Volume 1: The development of the battlefleet 1650–1850. Conway Maritime Press. .

Ships of the line of the Royal Navy
1743 ships